is a railway station in the city of Toyama, Toyama Prefecture, Japan, operated by the private railway operator Toyama Chihō Railway.

Lines

Station layout 
The station has one ground-level side platform serving a single bi-directional track. The station is unattended.

History
Sakaemachi Station was opened on 16 March 2019.

Adjacent stations

Surrounding area 
Toyama Prefectural Central Hospital
Toyama Prefectural University (School of Nursing)
Tōbu branch of Toyama City Public Library
Toyama City Tōbu Elementary School

See also
 List of railway stations in Japan

References

External links
 

Railway stations in Toyama Prefecture
Railway stations in Japan opened in 2019
Stations of Toyama Chihō Railway